Shoitsu Omatsu (大松 尚逸, born June 16, 1982 in Kanazawa, Ishikawa) is a Japanese former professional baseball outfielder in Japan's Nippon Professional Baseball. He played with the Chiba Lotte Marines from 2005 to 2015 and with the Tokyo Yakult Swallows in 2017. He has been a coach since 2020.

External links

NPB

1982 births
Baseball people from Ishikawa Prefecture
Chiba Lotte Marines players
Japanese baseball coaches
Japanese baseball players
Living people
Nippon Professional Baseball coaches
Nippon Professional Baseball outfielders
Tokyo Yakult Swallows players